James Douglas "Mike" McKevitt (October 26, 1928 – September 28, 2000) was a U.S. Representative from Colorado.

Born in Spokane, Washington, McKevitt graduated from Grant High School in Sacramento, California.
He received a B.A. from the University of Idaho (Moscow, Idaho) in 1951, and a law degree from the University of Denver School of Law in 1956.
He was in the United States Air Force from 1951 to 1953, rising to the rank of captain.
He was a lawyer in private practice.
He served as assistant attorney general, Colorado state attorney general's office from 1958 to 1967.
He served as District Attorney, Denver, Colorado from 1967 to 1971, during which time McKevitt became known for prosecuting and harassing Denver's "hippies" and the restaurants where they would eat.

McKevitt was elected as a Republican to the Ninety-second Congress (January 3, 1971 – January 3, 1973).  That year, 20-year incumbent Democrat Byron Rogers had been defeated in the primary by a considerably more liberal Democrat, attorney Craig Barnes. Several of Rogers' more conservative supporters threw their support to McKevitt in the general election. The split in the party combined with McKevitt's popularity to allow McKevitt to win by 10,000 votes.  However, McKevitt was a conservative Republican in a strongly Democratic district, and he was defeated for reelection to the Ninety-third Congress in 1972 by liberal Democrat Pat Schroeder.

McKevitt remained in Washington for some time after his brief congressional term, serving as Assistant United States Attorney General, Office of Legislation in 1973, a counsel on energy policy the White House from 1973 to 1974, and a member of the Korean War Memorial Commission from 1987 to 1995. He died on September 28, 2000, in Washington, D.C. He was interred at Arlington National Cemetery, Arlington, Virginia.

References

1928 births
2000 deaths
University of Idaho alumni
Sturm College of Law alumni
United States Air Force officers
Burials at Arlington National Cemetery
District attorneys in Colorado
Republican Party members of the United States House of Representatives from Colorado
20th-century American politicians